Lego Power Miners was a product range of the construction toy Lego, themed around a team of "Power Miners" who, while investigating the cause of a series of severe earthquakes, discover Rock Monsters and Energy Crystals. The theme was originally released in 2009 after the discontinued Lego Rock Raiders theme. The product line was discontinued by the end of 2010.

Overview
The Power Miners (Doc, Duke, Rex, and Brains) are sent underground by the government to investigate a series of earthquakes that have destroyed several cities on the surface of the Lego World. While underground, they discover Energy Crystals and the Rock Monsters (Meltrox, Boulderax, Glaciator, Sulfurix, Firox, Geolix and Tremorox). They attempt to collect and mine the crystals in order to stop the monsters from consuming them and causing the earthquakes on the surface. However, a bigger threat emerges in the form of the Crystal King, the undisputed ruler of all Rock Monsters underground.

In January 2010, a new sub-theme called Power Miners: Core of the Underworld was introduced, with the plot having the Power Miners collapse to a lower level of caves while fighting the Crystal King with the Titanuim Command Rig, finding themselves in the inner core of the earth and encounter the Lava Monsters (Firax, Combustix, Infernox, and Eruptorr).

Construction sets 
According to Bricklink, The Lego Group released 24 playsets and promotional polybags as part of the Lego Power Miners theme. The product line was eventually discontinued by the end of December 2010.

Below is a list of Power Miners sets. The first two promotional sets were released in December 2008, but later in the year a few of the first wave sets were available at Toys "R" Us stores. Finally, in January 2009, the entire first wave was released. A second batch of sets was released in May 2009 and a third wave of sets in August 2009. All four new sets of 2010 were released in January 2010 to Europe, while sets 8190 and 8191 were not released to America until August 2010. Most of the sets were similar to the Lego Rock Raiders theme.

Awards and nominations 
In 2009, Titanium Command Rig was awarded "DreamToys" in the Construction category by the Toy Retailers Association.

See also 
 Lego Rock Raiders

References

External links 
 

Power Miners
Products introduced in 2009
Products and services discontinued in 2010